Paratalanta is a genus of moths of the family Crambidae.

Species
Paratalanta acutangulata Swinhoe, 1901
Paratalanta aureolalis (Lederer, 1863)
Paratalanta contractalis Warren, 1896
Paratalanta cultralis (Staudinger, 1867)
Paratalanta hyalinalis (Hübner, 1796)
Paratalanta pandalis (Hübner, 1825)
Paratalanta stachialis Toll & Wojtusiak, 1957
Paratalanta ussurialis (Bremer, 1864)

Former species
Paratalanta homoculorum (Bänziger, 1995)

References

Natural History Museum Lepidoptera genus database

Pyraustinae
Crambidae genera
Taxa named by Edward Meyrick